Coaldale (Rednek Air) Aerodrome  is located  northeast of Coaldale, Alberta, Canada.

References

Registered aerodromes in Alberta
Lethbridge County